David R. Vance (born August 22, 1940, in Logansport, Indiana) is an American Thoroughbred horse racing trainer who has won more than 3,000 races.

Vance has won three training titles at Churchill Downs, three at Keystone Racetrack and two at the now defunct Garden State Park.

One of his best horses was Caressing, winner of the 2000 Breeders' Cup Juvenile Fillies who was voted the Eclipse Award as American Champion Two-Year-Old Filly.

References
David Vance's bio at Breeders' Cup.com

1940 births
Living people
American horse trainers
People from Logansport, Indiana